The Fantastic Four is a team of comic book superheroes in the Marvel Comics universe. Although the name suggests the team only has four members, in reality a number of other characters have, at one point or another, been considered members. Bold indicates current team member.

Fantastic Four

Close associates
A number of characters are closely affiliated with the team, share complex personal histories with one or more of its members but have never actually held an official membership. They include but are not limited to:
 Agatha Harkness: Agatha is initially hired by the Richards as a nanny for Franklin, and she is a witch from the Salem Witch Trials.
 Alicia Masters: Alicia is a blind sculptress, stepdaughter of the supervillain Puppet Master, and a longtime love interest of the Thing, as her blindness allows her to see the man inside rather than what he looks like. She also has a close relationship with Silver Surfer and travels with him for some time, and she is a frequent caretaker of Franklin and Valeria.
 Doctor Doom: He and Mister Fantastic attended college together, and he blames Richards for an experiment gone wrong which scarred his face. As the monarch of Latveria, he is the team's most deadly foe, although he sometimes helps them, such as when he aids in the birth of Valeria Richards.
 H.E.R.B.I.E. (Humanoid Experimental Robot, B-type, Integrated Electronics): H.E.R.B.I.E. is a robotic ally who first appeared in the 1978 Fantastic Four animated television series before being introduced into regular Marvel Universe continuity. The original H.E.R.B.I.E. is destroyed fighting Doctor Sun. Reed Richards builds later generations of H.E.R.B.I.E.s to act as a nanny/guardian for Franklin and Valeria.
 Inhuman Royal Family: Despite an initial conflict due to a misunderstanding, the Inhuman Royal Family is closely associated with the Fantastic Four, particularly Medusa and Crystal, who have both been members of the team.
 Kristoff Vernard: Kristoff is the former heir of Doctor Doom. While under the delusion that he was the real Doctor Doom, Kristoff destroys the original Baxter Building.
 Lyja: Lyja is a female Skrull trained as an espionage agent. She secretly replaces Alicia between the events of The Thing #10 and Fantastic Four #265 (both April 1984). She falls in love with the Human Torch, and they eventually marry. Her identity was revealed in Fantastic Four #357–358 (October–November 1991), albeit as a retcon. Lyja helped the team recover the original Alicia to prove that she could be trusted. Her allegiances have since been divided between her native race and her new family, particularly her husband.
 Namor the Sub-Mariner: Initially cured of amnesia by the Human Torch, Namor has been both an ally and an enemy to the team.  Namor and the Invisible Woman have occasionally been romantically attracted, though she eventually chooses to marry Mister Fantastic.
 Roberta: An android (refers to herself as a "mechanized human") built by Reed Richards to function solely as the Fantastic Four's receptionist. She has proven to be a reliable ally and has shown to be capable of turning away protruders by force.
 Silver Surfer: Silver Surfer was initially at odds with the Fantastic Four as a herald of Galactus when he comes to devour Earth. It is his encounter with the Fantastic Four that persuades him to rebel against his master and drive Galactus away from Earth. Since then, he is a friend and frequent ally of the team.
 Molecule Man: Owen Reece was a weak and shy boy who was bullied by everyone. Later, when he grew up, he became a laboratory technician on a Nuclear plant, where he gained powers from a particle generator which bombarded him with an unknown form of radiation. The radiation had a mutagenic effect on Reece, releasing his potential for psionic powers on a cosmic scale. Reece could now control all matter, even down to the molecular level, and all energy. Using his newfound powers he went to take revenge on his bullies. He often came in conflict with the team, but at times, he also worked with them, acting as an anti-hero.
 Thundra: Thundra is a Femizon warrior who originates from a matriarchal technologically advanced society in an alternate reality's 23rd century. She initially appears as a member of convenience of the Frightful Four, but her true purpose was to challenge the Thing as she believes he is the strongest male warrior in history. She goes on to become a frequent ally of the team and shows romantic interest in the Thing.
  Uatu the Watcher: Uatu is a member of the Watchers, an extraterrestrial race that monitors and records the activities of other planets, who are forbidden from interfering. Uatu has shown an affinity for humanity, particularly the Fantastic Four, and has occasionally broken this rule to assist them.
 Wyatt Wingfoot: Johnny Storm's college friend, Native American sometime-adventurer, and one-time love interest of She-Hulk, Wyatt is the son of "Big Will Wingfoot," one of Empire State University's most legendary football players.

New Fantastic Four
In Fantastic Four (1st series) #347–349 (December 1990 – February 1991) a female Skrull alien who was both a shape-shifter and a telepath managed to capture the team.  Impersonating the Invisible Woman, she falsely reported the other members to be deceased and recruited four other heroes as a new Fantastic Four to avenge them, before dispatching them to try and steal a powerful weapon from the Mole Man. Members of this short-lived team included:

 The Hulk (in his grey "Mr. Fixit" persona)
 Spider-Man. He had actually once applied for membership in the team in The Amazing Spider-Man (1st series) #1 (March 1963), but quit upon realization that he would not be paid. He and the Human Torch remain longtime friends.
 Wolverine
 Ghost Rider (Danny Ketch)

In Fantastic Four (1st series) #374–375 (March 1993 – April 1993), Dr. Strange brings this same team back together to arrest the Human Torch after he went nova and destroyed a whole quarter of the city. This story was the start for the Secret Defenders ongoing series.

In Wolverine #148 (January 2000) the team comes back together during the Ages of Apocalypse reality to fight Arnim Zola, Blastaar and Annihilus with all four members wearing the popular blue FF costumes and the Hulk frequently switching between his various personalities. They also came together to battle a version of the Wendigo.

An alternate version of this team was temporarily summoned to the Marvel Universe by Psycho-Man during the Fear Itself storyline to defeat the Fearsome Four of Howard the Duck, She-Hulk, Nighthawk, and Frankenstein's Monster when Psycho-Man sought to turn Man-Thing into a fear bomb, but they were defeated by the use of Howard the Duck's secret weapon.

This team has also been shown in various What If tales and a Mini-Marvel one-shot.

A second team has appeared in the new Venom series, the team's first appearance is in the six-part mini-series Circle of Four which started in Venom (Vol. 2) #13 (February 2012), the members of this team include:

 Venom replacing Spider-Man.
 Red Hulk replacing the original Hulk.
 X-23 replacing Wolverine.
 Ghost Rider (Alejandra Jones) replacing Danny Ketch.

Starting with Ghost Rider Vol. 8 #1, a group of heroes form resembling that of the new fantastic four line-up with the Agents of S.H.I.E.L.D. as backup.

 Silk parallels Spider-Man.
 Hulk (Amadeus Cho) parallels the original Hulk.
 Wolverine (Laura Kinney) parallels the original Wolverine.
 Ghost Rider (Robbie Reyes) parallels the Danny Ketch, Ghost Rider.

Fantastic Five

In the MC2 alternate future, the team is known as the Fantastic Five and consists of the following members:

Johnny Storm, the Human Torch
Ben Grimm, the Thing
Lyja Storm, Ms. Fantastic - Johnny's wife, a member of the shape-shifting Skrull race.
Franklin Richards, Psi-Lord - Son of Reed and Sue.
Jacob Grimm, Grim - The son of Ben Grimm and Sharon Ventura, he is similar in appearance to his father, and also possesses his strength levels.
Big Brain (Earth-982) - Reed Richards built the robot Big Brain to act as a replacement for himself and his wife Susan, act independently but could also be operated remotely by Reed if his expertise was needed.
Version 1.0: flight, generate force fields, and energy beams. Version 2.0: required a hovercart for flight and could not emit energy beams.

References

Fantastic Five Vol 1 #1
Published
October, 1999

Fantastic Four members, List of
Fantastic Four